The Railroad Call Historic District encompasses three adjacent railroad worker housing units at 108, 1112, and 114 South Pulaski Street in Little Rock, Arkansas.  All three are single-story wood frame Colonial Revival structures, with gabled roofs and weatherboard siding, with some use of wooden shingles in gable ends.  Two of the buildings have full-width front porches; the third has a half-width porch.  These houses were built for workers constructing the nearby Missouri Pacific Railroad station (now the site of the 1921 Little Rock Union Station).  The buildings were saved from demolition in 1996 and converted to offices.

The buildings were listed on the National Register of Historic Places in 1997.

See also
National Register of Historic Places listings in Little Rock, Arkansas

References

Houses on the National Register of Historic Places in Arkansas
Colonial Revival architecture in Arkansas
Houses in Little Rock, Arkansas
National Register of Historic Places in Little Rock, Arkansas